Folkstreams is a non-profit organization that aims to collect and make available online documentary films about American folk art and culture.

It preserves and provides wide access to documentary films about the activities, voices, and experiences of members of America's diverse regional, ethnic, religious, and occupational cultures. The films show a variety of documentary approaches but commonly let the people themselves present their own circumstances, values, and arts.

Folkstreams was conceived and developed by filmmaker Tom Davenport  in 1999.  Encouraged by folklorist Dr. Daniel Patterson from the University of North Carolina in Chapel Hill, Davenport saw the importance of these films and knew from experience that their natural audiences had difficulty finding and seeing them. Many of the films are old, out of print, rare, and endangered. Others are obtainable only from little-known distributors. Their age and outdated formats, their non-standard lengths, the regional and ethnic speech of the people they feature, and their unusual subject matters had excluded many from the mainstream mass market television and cable broadcast opportunities in the last half of the 20th century.

As of early 2021, Folkstreams was streaming over 375 such documentaries created since 1949. The goal of Folkstreams is to recover many more such films, deposit copies in a library for long-term preservation, and digitize and stream the films for the internet public. About a quarter of these are shown with background information about the making of the film and the traditions presented. Most films on Folkstreams are protected by copyright, and the filmmakers have given their permission and encouragement for the streaming. An archive of all footage and corresponding materials is kept at the [Southern Folklife Collection http://www2.lib.unc.edu/wilson/sfc/] at the Wilson Library in Chapel Hill, North Carolina.

Folkstreams works with the National Film Preservation Foundation to identify and restore endangered 16mm films. Folkstreams made the website Video Aids to Film Preservation to help the public and conservators better understand the technology of film.  The Folkstreams database platform was created in 2002 by Steve Knoblock, and continues to be the foundation for the website where the films are related to contextual background entries.

In 2021 Tom Davenport received a National Heritage Fellowship award  from the National Endowment for the Arts for his work developing Folkstreams.net.

Example films
Gandy dancers 

The High Lonesome Sound

See also
Film preservation
Judy Peiser
Journal of American Folklore
Southern Folklife Collection

References

External links 
http://www.folkstreams.net/ 
https://www.youtube.com/user/folkstreamer?ob=0&feature=results_main
Southern Folklife Collection, Wilson Special Collections Library, University of North Carolina at Chapel Hill

Film preservation organizations
Documentary film organizations
Video hosting
American folk art